Show Window: The Queen's House is a South Korean television series starring Song Yoon-ah, Lee Sung-jae, Jeon So-min and Hwang Chan-sung. It aired from November 29, 2021, to January 18, 2022, on Channel A's Mondays and Tuesdays at 21:30 (KST) time slot for 16 episodes.

The series was a commercial hit and became one of the highest rated Korean series on cable television history. With an average nationwide viewership ratings of 10.335% for its final episode aired on January 18, 2022, it set a new record for the highest viewership ratings of any Channel A series.

Synopsis
It is about a woman who supports the adultery of another woman, without knowing that the affair is with her husband.

Cast

Main
 Song Yoon-ah as Han Sun-joo, Myung-seob's wife who has everything from beauty, to intelligence and wealth. Deciding to stay out of her family-controlled fashion house, she helps her husband with her excellent skills and raises their children with her meticulous personality.
 Lee Sung-jae as Shin Myung-seob, Sun-joo's husband who came from a humble background and turned his life around after marriage, but falls into a crisis due to an extramarital affair. He is the executive director of the family firm, reporting to his mother-in-law, Kim Kang-im.
 Jeon So-min as Yoon Mi-ra, a beautiful and charming woman who is faithful to her desires. She meets Myung-seob and falls in love with him. She is an art teacher at a primary school.
 Hwang Chan-sung as Han Jung-won, Sun-joo's younger brother who is optimistic and warm-hearted. He trusts and relies on his older sister more than anyone else. He is studying fashion in Milan while also working in the family firm.

Supporting

People around Sun-joo
 Kim Seung-soo as Cha Young-hoon, Sun-joo's ex-boyfriend and college classmate who is now a psychiatrist.
 Moon Hee-kyung as Kim Kang-im, Sun-joo and Jung-won's mother who is a demanding matriarch and chairperson of the family firm.
 Shin Yi-jun as Shin Tae-hee, Sun-joo and Myung-seob's daughter.
 Park Sang-hoon as Shin Tae-yong, Sun-joo and Myung-seob's son.

People in townhouse
 Kim Hye-in as Choi Eun-kyung
 Lee Sun-jin as Park Ye-rang
 Oh Seung-eun as Christina Jung
 Kim Young-jun as Ahn Do-hyuk
 Kim Jung-tae as Lee Joon-sang

Others
 as Han Yeon-joo
 Kim Byeong-ok as Kang Dae-wook
 Jung Se-hyeong as Tango Master
 Jeong Jung-ah as Mrs. Jeong

Extended
 Moon Seo-yeon as Secretary Kang
 Park Jung-hak as Mi-ra's uncle

Production
The first script reading of the cast was held in June 2021. Show Window: The Queen's House is labelled as "Channel A's Tenth Anniversary Special Project".

It was reported that the series finished filming on January 11, 2022.

Original soundtrack

Part 1

Part 2

Part 3

Part 4

Part 5

Viewership

Accolades

Notes

References

External links
  
 
 

Channel A television dramas
Korean-language television shows
South Korean melodrama television series
South Korean mystery television series
2021 South Korean television series debuts
2022 South Korean television series endings
Wavve original programming